Pac-12 Conference basketball championship may refer to

Pac-12 Conference men's basketball regular season champion
Pac-12 Conference women's basketball regular season champion
Championship won in the Pac-12 Conference men's basketball tournament
Championship won in the Pac-12 Conference women's basketball tournament